MediaCorp Channel 8's television series Tiger Mum is a family drama series produced by MediaCorp Singapore in 2015. It revolves around a senior prison officer whose nickname is ‘Tigress’ due to her stern tiger mother behaviour and demeanour. As of 6 May 2015, all 20 episodes of Tiger Mum have been aired on MediaCorp Channel 8. In addition, during the credits at the end of each episode, scenes of the show were available for viewing on Toggle as epilogues.

Episodic guide

See also
List of MediaCorp Channel 8 Chinese drama series (2010s)
Tiger Mum

References

Lists of Singaporean television series episodes